Evelina Louise Samuelsson (born 14 March 1984 in Stockholm, Sweden) is an ice hockey player from Sweden. She won a bronze medal at the 2002 Winter Olympics.

See also
Sweden at the 2002 Winter Olympics

References

1984 births
Ice hockey players at the 2002 Winter Olympics
Living people
Medalists at the 2002 Winter Olympics
Olympic bronze medalists for Sweden
Olympic ice hockey players of Sweden
Olympic medalists in ice hockey
Ice hockey people from Stockholm
Swedish women's ice hockey players